Kabhi Haan Kabhi Naa is a 1994 Hindi-language coming-of-age romantic comedy film directed by Kundan Shah, starring Shah Rukh Khan and Deepak Tijori. It also featured Suchitra Krishnamurthy (in her Hindi film debut) and Naseeruddin Shah.

At the 39th Filmfare Awards, it won 2 awards – Best Film (Critics) and Best Actor (Critics) for Khan, who also won Best Actor for Baazigar at the same ceremony. It is widely considered to be one of Khan's best performances, and he has said that it is his favorite film. It was premiered at the Indian Panorama section of the 24th International Film Festival of India.

The film was remade in Telugu as Swapnalokam (1999). Shah Rukh Khan has bought the rights to the film under his banner, Red Chillies Entertainment. Kabhi Haan Kabhi Naa has also drawn comparisons to the later Hollywood film 500 Days of Summer (2009).

Plot 

Sunil (Shah Rukh Khan) is woken up from his dream of marrying the girl he loves, Anna (Suchitra Krishnamurthy), by his sister (Sadiya Siddiqui).

Sunil is a happy-go-lucky scamp who loves music and is not interested in studies, which bothers his father, Vinayak (Anjan Srivastav). Everyone has given up on Sunil and thinks he is good for nothing except for Father Braganza (Naseeruddin Shah) who believes Sunil is pure at heart.

Sunil, Anna, and Chris (Deepak Tijori) are 3 members of a 6-person music band, who are looking to make it big. Anna rejoins the group after being away for a while, which makes Chris happy as he loves Anna. After Anna reenters his life, Sunil begins to try and change his ways in order to get Anna to fall in love with him.

During a performance at a friend's wedding, Sunil notices the closeness between Anna and Chris. Devastated, he decides to create a rift between them. Sunil eventually gets caught in his own web of lies. A furious Anna slaps him and decides to never talk to him again. Sunil is thrown out of the band. However, fortune favors Sunil who saves the band from being heckled at a local club by putting on a stellar show; the entire band forgives and forgets.

Sunil thinks he has won Anna back but finds out that Anna and Chris love each other and want to be married. Crushed to pieces, Sunil accepts he has lost in love.

Meanwhile, Anna's father decides that Chris is worthy of marrying her. He makes his intentions known but Chris' parents have other ideas and decide Chris's marriage to their friend's daughter. Anna and her family are dejected.

Sunil consoles Anna and the tide slowly turns in his favor. Anna's father, having realized that Sunil will love and take care of her, convinces Anna to marry Sunil. Sunil is overjoyed until he realizes Anna still loves Chris. Sunil decides to reunite the two and get them married. On their wedding day, as Chris and Anna are about to exchange rings, Chris drops his ring and it rolls out of sight. Sunil spots the ring but feigns ignorance, even as his younger sister gazes at him with a heavy heart. Eventually, Chris locates the ring and the couple gets married.

Just after the wedding, Sunil is shown sitting on the sidewalk, dejected, and heartbroken. By happenstance, a random girl (Juhi Chawla), who is lost and is seeking directions, approaches Sunil. Sometime later, Sunil and the girl are seen walking in the moonlight and talking merrily.

Anthony and Vasco, two criminals who are a part of the story, see Sunil with the new girl and break the fourth wall, saying that Sunil will be alright. The criminals hear the police siren and immediately scamper away as the credits roll.

Cast 
Shah Rukh Khan as Sunil
Depak Tijori as Chris Rodriguez
Suchitra Krishnamurthy as Anna Gonsalves
Rita Bhaduri as Mary Gonsalves, Anna's mother
Satish Shah as Simon Gonsalves, Anna's father and a confectioner
Anjan Srivastava as Vinayak, Sunil's father and a mechanic
Goga Kapoor as Anthony Gomes, the Don
Tiku Talsania as Patel, the bar owner
Ravi Baswani as Albert Gonsalves, Anna's brother
Naseeruddin Shah as Father Braganza, a priest
Ashutosh Gowarikar as Imran, Sunil's friend
Kurush Deboo as Yezdi, Sunil's best friend
Aditya Lakhia as Tony, Sunil's friend
Shashi Sahay as Prabha, Sunil's mother
Sadiya Siddiqui as Nikki, Sunil's sister
Virendra Saxena as Vasco, Anthony's right-hand-man
Anita Kanwal as Chris's mother
Jyoti Nathan
Suhaas
Preeta Mathur
Snehal Lakhia
Munila Siddiqui
Ajit Vachani in a special appearance as Charles Rodriguez, Chris's father
Juhi Chawla in a special appearance

Music 
The music was composed by Jatin–Lalit, while the lyrics were penned by Majrooh Sultanpuri. The song "Sachhi Ye Kahaani Hai" derives from two songs: Boney M.'s "Rasputin" (1978), and Johnny Wakelin's "In Zaire". Kabhi Haan Kabhi Naa sold over 800,000 soundtrack albums in India.

Awards 

 39th Filmfare Awards:
 Best Film (Critics)
 Best Actor (Critics) – Shah Rukh Khan

References

External links 
 
 Kabhi Haan Kabhi Naa Full Movie at Filmywrep

1990s Hindi-language films
Films scored by Jatin–Lalit
1994 films
Hindi films remade in other languages
Films shot in Goa
Films directed by Kundan Shah
Indian coming-of-age films